= Minkowski geometry =

Minkowski geometry may refer to:

- The geometry of a finite-dimensional normed space
- The geometry of Minkowski space
